Ihor Mykhaylovych Rybak (also spelled Igor Rybak, 21 March 1934 – 28 September 2005) was a Ukrainian weightlifter. He competed for the Soviet Union twice, at the 1956 Summer Olympics and 1956 European Championships. On both occasions he won ahead of Ravil Khabutdinov. Due to the severe competition within the Soviet Union, Rybak never won a national title, and by 1960 was left out of the national team. In retirement he worked in sports medicine.

References

External links

1934 births
2005 deaths
Sportspeople from Kharkiv
Ukrainian male weightlifters
Soviet male weightlifters
Olympic weightlifters of the Soviet Union
Weightlifters at the 1956 Summer Olympics
Olympic gold medalists for the Soviet Union
Olympic medalists in weightlifting
Avanhard (sports society) sportspeople
Medalists at the 1956 Summer Olympics
European Weightlifting Championships medalists